Gandhi Stadium or Burlton Park or BS Bedi Stadium is located in the city of Jalandhar, Punjab and is used for cricket matches. As of 19 August 2017 it has hosted 1 Test and 3 ODIs. The stadium should not be confused with the 10,000-capacity Gandhi Stadium in Ambikapur, which is used for cricket and football.

History 

The stadium was built in 1955 and serves as the home ground for two Indian domestic cricket teams: Punjab and North Zone. The stadium hosted a solitary Test Match against Pakistan as well as 3 ODI matches with the host team - India winning both of these matches.

With the advent of Mohali Cricket Stadium outside Chandigarh, it is unlikely that other stadiums in the state of Punjab will get an opportunity to host international cricket matches.
The highest score in Test cricket was made by India who scored 374 against Pakistan. The most runs scored were by Anshuman Gaekwad (201 runs), Wasim Raja (125 runs) and Javed Miandad (66 runs). The most wickets taken were by Wasim Raja and Kapil Dev (4 wickets), along with Ravi Shastri (3 wickets).
The highest score in ODI cricket was made by West Indies who scored 226 against Pakistan. The most runs scored were Dilip Vengsarkar (88 runs), Richie Richardson (77 runs) and Aamer Malik (77 runs). The most wickets taken were by Venkatapathy Raju (3 wickets), Graham Gooch (2 wickets) and Kapil Dev (2 wickets).

Demolition and Reconstruction 

Currently, there is a plan to construct a sports complex in Jalandhar City. Reconstruction of this cricket ground and converting it into an international level cricket stadium is also included in the project. All the stands were demolished. However, due to some legal problems, this project was stopped for a while. A few months later some reconstruction was seen. The stadium is not hosting any matches currently because the main pitch is also being reconstructed. Although practice sessions for budding cricketers have not been stopped.

See also 

List of Test cricket grounds
 One-Test wonder

References

External links
 Cricinfo Website - Ground Page

Sport in Jalandhar
Test cricket grounds in India
Sports venues in Punjab, India
Cricket grounds in Punjab, India
Sports venues in Jalandhar
1955 establishments in East Punjab
Sports venues completed in 1955
20th-century architecture in India